Yelovsky (masculine), Yelovskaya (feminine), or Yelovskoye (neuter) may refer to:
Yelovsky District, a district of Perm Krai, Russia
Yelovsky (volcano), a shield volcano in Russia